In the 1946–47 season, USM Blida competed in the First Division for the 14th season French colonial era, as well as the Forconi Cup. They competed in First Division, and the North African Cup.

Pre-season

Competitions

Overview

First Division

League table

Matches

Play-off

Forconi Cup

North African Cup

Players statistics

|-
! colspan=14 style=background:#dcdcdc; text-align:center| Goalkeepers

|-
! colspan=14 style=background:#dcdcdc; text-align:center| Defenders

|-
! colspan=14 style=background:#dcdcdc; text-align:center| Midfielders

|-
! colspan=14 style=background:#dcdcdc; text-align:center| Forwards

|}
Reserve: Rabah Hamou, Bradai, M'henni Zahzah, Ali Reguieg, Boukhalfa, Laidi Mustapha, Youssari Embarek, Zouthi, Benazout, Bouguerra M, Bouchekour Mohamed.

Goalscorers

Transfers

In

References

External links
Presse et revues L'Echo d'Alger : journal républicain du matin

USM Blida seasons
Algerian football clubs 1946–47 season